Samuel Stein (April 1, 1905 – March 30, 1966) was an American football player, actor, and professional wrestler. He played four seasons in the National Football League (NFL) as an end and tackle for the Staten Island Stapletons (1929-1930), New York Giants (1931), and Brooklyn Dodgers (1932). He appeared in 31 NFL games, 21 as a starter.

Selected filmography

 The Life of Jimmy Dolan (1933) - King Cobra (uncredited)
 The Lost Patrol (1934) - Abelson
 Goin' to Town (1935) - Cowboy (uncredited)
 Love Me Forever (1935) - Joe, Casino Floorman (uncredited)
 Modern Times (1936) - Turbine Operator
 The Saint's Double Trouble (1940) - Policeman (uncredited)
 The Saint Takes Over (1940) - Hood (uncredited)
 Millionaires in Prison (1940) - Mess Hall Guard (uncredited)
 One Crowded Night (1940) - Mike, Bus Driver (uncredited)
 Prairie Schooners (1940) - Dude Geeter (uncredited)
 The Long Voyage Home (1940) - Seaman (uncredited)
 Mexican Spitfire (1940) - Cowboy (uncredited)
 The Wildcat of Tucson (1940) - Gus Logan - Henchman
 Murder Among Friends (1941) - Policeman (uncredited)
 Footlight Fever (1941) - Mike - First Robber (uncredited)
 Sailors on Leave (1941) - Sailor (uncredited)
 Public Enemies (1941) - Jake
 Sierra Sue (1941) - Irate Cowboy at Human Cannonball show (uncredited)
 Sing Your Worries Away (1942) - Henchman (uncredited)
 Broadway (1942) - Slug (uncredited)
 Remember Pearl Harbor (1942) - MP Sgt. Adams
 Syncopation (1942) - Gangster (uncredited)
 My Favorite Spy (1942) - Marine Socking Kay (uncredited)
 Powder Town (1942) - Battman, a Henchman (uncredited)
 The Big Street (1942) - Mug at Mindy's (uncredited)
 Road to Morocco (1942) - Guard (uncredited)
 Gentleman Jim (1942) - Joe Choynski (uncredited)
 Pittsburgh (1942) - Killer Kane (uncredited)
 No Time for Love (1943) - Sandhog (uncredited)
 It Ain't Hay (1943) - Bouncer (uncredited)
 Sleepy Lagoon (1943) - Lug (uncredited)
 Crazy House (1943) - Dead End Character (uncredited)
 Swing Fever (1943) - Wrestler (uncredited)
 Never a Dull Moment (1943) - Romeo
 Ghost Catchers (1944) - Mug (uncredited)
 Marine Raiders (1944) - Sergeant (uncredited)
 Kismet (1944) - Policeman (uncredited)
 Frenchman's Creek (1944) - Pirate Crewman (uncredited)
 Lost in a Harem (1944) - Native Jailor (uncredited)
 The Princess and the Pirate (1944) - Blackjack Thug (uncredited)
 The Big Show-Off (1945) - Boris the Bulgar
 Here Come the Co-eds (1945) - Tiger McGurk aka The Masked Marvel (uncredited)
 Bring on the Girls (1945) - Shore Patrol Guard (uncredited)
 The Great John L. (1945) - Fight Spectator (uncredited)
 Road to Utopia (1945) - Husky Sailor (uncredited)
 They Were Expendable (1945) - Sammy - Boat Crewman (uncredited)
 The French Key (1946) - Percy
 The Dark Horse (1946) - 1st Ambulance Attendant (uncredited)
 Death Valley (1946) - Bartender (uncredited)
 Shoot to Kill (1947) - Blackie
 Riffraff (1947) - Henchman (uncredited)
 The Crimson Key (1947) - Roger - Gunman (uncredited)
 Variety Girl (1947) - Masseur (uncredited)
 If You Knew Susie (1948) - Wee Willie (uncredited)
 Mighty Joe Young (1949) - Strongman (uncredited)
 The Veils of Bagdad (1953) - Abdallah
 The Body Is a Shell (1957) - (final film role)

References

1905 births
1966 deaths
Staten Island Stapletons players
New York Giants players
Brooklyn Dodgers (NFL) players
Players of American football from New York City
American football tackles
American football ends
Professional wrestlers from New York City